Ichirai (一来, died 1180) was a Japanese warrior monk who supported the Minamoto clan of samurai against their rivals, the Taira clan.

Ichirai-hōshi is best known for his part in the battle of Uji. He was fighting behind Tsutsui Jōmyō Meishū on the Uji bridge, but as the beams were so narrow he could not come alongside his ally. He is said to have leapt over the other monk, taken over the brunt of the fighting, and continued until he fell.

References

Turnbull, Stephen. Warriors of Medieval Japan. Oxford: Osprey Publishing, 2005

Japanese warrior monks
1180 deaths
People of Heian-period Japan
Heian period Buddhist clergy
Year of birth unknown